Bassford is a surname. Notable people with the surname include:

Christopher Bassford (born 1953), American military historian
Edward Bassford (1837–1912), American architect
Richard Bassford (born 1936), American illustrator

See also
Basford (disambiguation)